Gilles Gauthier (September 3, 1935 – August 17, 2015) was a politician from Quebec, Canada. He was a Member of the National Assembly.

Background 

He was born on September 3, 1935 in Louiseville, Quebec and was a lawyer.

Federal Politics 

Gauthier ran as a Progressive Conservative candidate in the federal district of Trois-Rivières in 1968, but lost against Liberal incumbent Joseph-Alfred Mongrain.

Member of the Legislature  and work for the Montréal Conservatoire

He ran as a Union Nationale candidate in the district of Trois-Rivières in a 1969 by-election, following the resignation of Yves Gabias and won.

He lost his bid for re-election in 1970 and was defeated in the district of Champlain in 1976. In 1978-1979 he served as the interim director of the Conservatoire de musique du Québec à Montréal after Raymond Daveluy left the post. He was succeeded by Albert Grenier.

References 

1935 births
Living people
People associated with the Conservatoire de musique du Québec à Montréal
People from Louiseville
Union Nationale (Quebec) MNAs